Petit-Caux is a commune in the department of Seine-Maritime, northern France. The municipality was established on 1 January 2016 by merger of the 18 former communes of Saint-Martin-en-Campagne, Assigny, Auquemesnil, Belleville-sur-Mer, Berneval-le-Grand, Biville-sur-Mer, Bracquemont, Brunville, Derchigny, Glicourt, Gouchaupre, Greny, Guilmécourt, Intraville, Penly, Saint-Quentin-au-Bosc, Tocqueville-sur-Eu and Tourville-la-Chapelle. These communes previously cooperated in the Communauté de communes du Petit Caux.

Population

See also 
Communes of the Seine-Maritime department

References 

Communes of Seine-Maritime
Populated places established in 2016
2016 establishments in France
Caletes